Massalski (feminine: Massalska, plural: Massalscy) is a Polish language surname. It may refer to:

Massalski family of Polish nobility
 Aleksander Masalski (1593-1643), voivode of Mińsk Voivodship
 Andrzej Massalski (died 1651), voivode of Mińsk Voivodship
 Michał Józef Massalski, Great Hetman of Lithuania
 Ignacy Jakub Massalski, Bishop of Wilno
 Józef Adrian Massalski (1726-1765), marszałek of the Sejm
 Helena Apolonia Massalska (1763-1815), diarist
 Edward Tomasz Massalski (1799-1879), writer and  publicist
 Józef Massalski (1800-1845), poet
Peter Massalski, East German slalom canoer
Barbara Massalska (1927-1980), Polish artist

See also
Mosalsky (disambiguation)

Polish-language surnames